Garrard County is a county located east-central Kentucky. As of the 2020 census, the county's population was 16,953.  Its county seat is Lancaster. The county was formed in 1796 and was named for James Garrard, Governor of Kentucky from 1796 to 1804. It is a prohibition or dry county, although its county seat, Lancaster, is wet. Lancaster was founded as a collection of log cabins in 1776 near a spring that later provided a constant source of water to early pioneers. It is one of the oldest cities in the Commonwealth. Boonesborough, 25 miles to the east, was founded by Daniel Boone in 1775. Lexington, 28 miles to the north, was founded in 1775. Stanford, originally known as St. Asaph, is 10 miles south of Lancaster. It too was founded in 1775. The oldest permanent settlement in Kentucky, Harrodsburg, was founded in 1774 and is 18 miles to the west. Garrard's present day courthouse is one of the oldest courthouses in Kentucky in continuous use.

History
The area presently bounded by Kentucky state lines was a part of the U.S. State of Virginia, and was established as Kentucky County by the Virginia legislature in 1776, before the British colonies separated themselves in the American Revolutionary War. In 1780, the Virginia legislature divided Kentucky County into three counties: Fayette, Jefferson, and Lincoln. In 1785, parts of Lincoln County were divided off to create Mercer and Madison Counties.

In 1791 the previous Kentucky County was incorporated into the new nation as a separate state, Kentucky. This change became official on June 1, 1792. In 1796, a portion of the remaining Lincoln County was combined with areas split off from Mercer and Madison Counties to form Garrard County. It was the 25th county to be formed in the new state. It was named for Col. James Garrard, second Governor of Kentucky and acting governor at the time of the county's establishment.

Harriet Beecher Stowe, author of the powerful antebellum novel Uncle Tom's Cabin, visited the Thomas Kennedy home located in the Paint Lick section of Garrard County in her only visit to the South while gathering material for the book. The cabin that formed the basis of her novel was an actual structure behind the plantation house. In 2008, Garrard County officials announced their intention to recreate the slave cabin on the grounds of the Governor William Owsley House. However, in 2018 newspaper articles showed the proposed site abandoned and grown over; a memorial in another Kentucky county (Mason) was continuing to honor the memory and contribution of Stowe.

Garrard County is historically a Whig and Republican County. Its early political leaders were outspoken supporters of Henry Clay. It was strongly pro-Union during the Civil War and has remained a Republican stronghold in the Bluegrass Region which was, until recently, largely Democratic.

Garrard County is the home of Camp Dick Robinson, the first Federal base south of the Ohio River during the Civil War.

Geography

Located in east-central Kentucky, most of the county lies within in the rolling hills of the Bluegrass region. The southeastern end of the county near the Cartersville community is in the Knobs region. Garrard County is considered to be part of Appalachia.

Adjacent counties
 Jessamine County  (north)
 Madison County  (northeast)
 Rockcastle County  (southeast)
 Lincoln County  (southwest)
 Boyle County  (west)
 Mercer County  (northwest)

Demographics

As of the census of 2000, there were 14,792 people, 5,741 households, and 4,334 families residing in the county. The racial makeup of the county was 95.75% White, 3.06% Black or African American, 0.13% Native American, 0.04% Asian, 0.43% from other races, and 0.59% from two or more races. 1.32% of the population were Hispanic or Latino of any race.

There were 5,741 households, out of which 33.40% had children under the age of 18 living with them, 62.60% were married couples living together, 9.40% had a female householder with no husband present, and 24.50% were non-families. 21.10% of all households were made up of individuals, and 9.50% had someone living alone who was 65 years of age or older. The average household size was 2.56 and the average family size was 2.95.

By age, 24.40% of the population was under 18, 8.10% from 18 to 24, 30.90% from 25 to 44, 23.60% from 45 to 64, and 13.00% were 65 or older. The median age was 37 years. For every 100 females there were 96.80 males. For every 100 females age 18 and over, there were 93.00 males.

The median income for a household in the county was $34,284, and the median income for a family was $41,250. Males had a median income of $30,989 versus $21,856 for females. The per capita income for the county was $16,915.  About 11.60% of families and 14.70% of the population were below the poverty line, including 19.10% of those under age 18 and 17.00% of those age 65 or over.

Communities
 Bryantsville
 Buckeye
 Cartersville
 Davis Town
 Hyattsville
 Lancaster (county seat)
 Paint Lick

Law and government
In the United States Senate, Garrard County is represented by US Senator Mitch McConnell and US Senator Rand Paul. Garrard County is in the 2nd Congressional District, represented by US Rep. Brett Guthrie; in the 22nd State Senatorial District represented by State Senator Tom Buford and in the 36th State Legislative District represented by State Representative Jonathan Shell.

Garrard County is governed by the Garrard County Fiscal Court, composed of the Judge Executive, who is elected countywide, and five Magistrates who are elected in magisterial districts representing different geographic areas of the county. Each member of the Fiscal Court is elected to a four-year term, pursuant to the Kentucky Constitution. Magistrates are addressed by the honorific "Squire." The Fiscal Court is represented by the County Attorney. The County Clerk archives all court records and keeps the minutes of meetings.
 Judge Executive Hon. John Wilson (R)
 Deputy Judge Executive Hon. James Bushnell (R)
 County Attorney Hon. Mark H. Metcalf (R)
 County Magistrates:
 Magistrate Dist. 1 Joe Leavell (R)
 Magistrate Dist. 2 Vickie Feldman (R)
 Magistrate Dist. 3 Bill Warren (R)
 Magistrate Dist. 4 Bobbie Preston (R)
 Magistrate Dist. 5 Betty Von Gruenigen (R)
 County Clerk Kevin Montgomery (R)
 Sheriff Tim Davis (R)
 Circuit Clerk Dana Hensley (R)
 PVA Kay Hall (R)
 Jailer Kevin Middleton (R)
 Coroner Shane Young (R)

Politics
Garrard County lies at the northeastern end of the historically Unionist belt of Kentucky, covering the eastern Pennyroyal Plateau, the southern tip of the Bluegrass Plateau, and the southwestern part of the Eastern Coalfield. Although it only provided a modest level of volunteers for the Union Army during the Civil War and had a very high proportion of slave owners amongst its 1860 electorate, Garrard County nonetheless came to form the northernmost border of the rock-ribbed Republican bloc of south-central Kentucky that includes such counties as Clinton, Cumberland, Russell, Casey, Pulaski, Laurel, Rockcastle, Monroe, McCreary, Clay, Jackson, Owsley and Leslie. The only Democratic Presidential candidates to carry Garrard County since the end of Reconstruction have been Woodrow Wilson in 1912, Franklin D. Roosevelt in 1932, 1936 and 1940, and Lyndon Johnson in 1964, and Roosevelt only won by 24 votes over Alf Landon and 14 votes over Wendell Willkie. Since 1944, when Thomas Dewey defeated Franklin Roosevelt by 278 votes, Garrard has voted Democratic in a presidential contest only once.

Popular culture
 John Michael Montgomery's 1995 hit "Sold (The Grundy County Auction Incident)" was filmed at the Garrard County Stockyards.
 Portions of John Michael Montgomery's 1997 hit "I miss you a little" were filmed in Garrard County.
 Portions of the 1957 movie "Raintree County" were filmed in Garrard County.
 In 2009, Garrard Economic Development Director Nathan Mick and local filmmaker Parker Young produced a short video titled: "It's Garrard County" a community effort to introduce the county to the world using new media.

Notable residents
 
 Simeon H. Anderson (1802–1840) - United States Representative from Garrard County, Kentucky; son-in-law of 16th Kentucky Governor William Owsley.
 John Boyle (1774–1834) - member of the U.S. House of Representatives and Chief Justice of the Kentucky Court of Appeals; one of Kentucky's earliest federal district court judges. Boyle County, Kentucky is named for him.
 William O. Bradley (1847–1914), a native of Garrard County - first Republican governor of Kentucky; second Republican U.S. senator from Kentucky. By age 14, he had twice run away from his home in Lancaster to join the Union Army in Somerset, Kentucky. With his parents' permission, he joined the Army at age 16 in 1863 and served in the ranks through the end of the war. He was a staunch abolitionist and made solid improvements in the civic life of black Kentuckians, assuring them of voting protections and appointing several to positions of influence in state government. He was an early supporter of Theodore Roosevelt for the U.S. presidency. In his first race for governor, Bradley reminded voters that his Democratic opponent, Simon Bolivar Buckner, had served as a general in the Confederate States Army and that Buckner had sought to separate Kentucky from the Union. Though Buckner narrowly won the race, he refused to debate Bradley a second time after their first encounter. He is buried in Frankfort, Kentucky. Bradley's statue stands outside the Garrard Justice Center.
 Kenny Davis (1949-) A Georgetown College basketball standout, Kenneth "Kenny" Davis was selected to the 1972 U.S. Olympic Basketball Team that played in the "Munich Games." Denied a gold medal due to cheating by Soviet-bloc referees, the team unanimously voted to refuse the silver medal offered them. The silver medals remain stored in a bank vault in Switzerland. Following his college and Olympic career, he became an athletic shoe representative for a number of major manufacturers.
 Bradley Kincaid (1895–1989) "The Kentucky Mountain Boy" - pioneer singer of folk songs and ballads on 1920s-40s radio. His radio program "The WLS Barn Dance" was broadcast across the country by WLS Radio in Chicago, Illinois. He was the first major country music star in the U.S.
 Robert P. Letcher(1788–1861) made his home in Garrard County. A Whig and close ally of Henry Clay, he served as a U.S. Congressman, Minister (Ambassador) to Mexico, and Governor of Kentucky. Letcher County, Kentucky is named in his honor. His statue stands outside the Garrard Justice Center. He is buried in Frankfort, Kentucky.
 Eddie Montgomery (1963 – ) - member of American country music duo Montgomery Gentry and brother of John Michael Montgomery. Both were raised in Garrard County.
 John Michael Montgomery (1965- ) - American country music artist, born and raised in Garrard County. He is the brother of Eddie Montgomery, another country music star of the group Montgomery Gentry.
 Allan A. Burton (1820-1878) An accomplished farmer, attorney, judge and diplomat, and a dedicated emancipationist, he served in influential positions throughout his adult life, including membership on the Kentucky Constitutional Convention of 1849 at which he proposed an amendment providing for the gradual emancipation of slaves. An ardent supporter of Abraham Lincoln for the presidency in 1860, he chaired the Republican Party's delegation from Kentucky and actively promoted Lincoln to win the party's nomination at the Chicago convention. In the Fall general election, Burton canvassed the state as one of Lincoln's electors. In 1861, Burton was appointed a judge by Lincoln to the U.S. Circuit Court of Appeals for the Dakota Territory, followed by another appointment as U.S. Minister to Bogota (i.e., Ambassador to Colombia), a post he held until 1868. He resumed the practice of law in both Kentucky and Washington DC until 1871, when he was appointed by President Grant as Interpreter and Secretary of the Santo Domingo Commission. He is buried in the Lancaster cemetery.
 Carrie (or Carry) Amelia Nation (1846–1911), native of Garrard County. In Medicine Lodge, Kansas she founded a branch of the Women's Christian Temperance Union (WCTU), a movement that opposed alcohol in pre-Prohibition America. Born Carrie Amelia Moore, she frequently reminded audiences of her married name and associated this with her temperance mission. Her home stands preserved on Fisher Ford Road near the Bryantsville community in north Garrard County.
 Jody Payne Guitarist who played with American country music star Willie Nelson for 34 years and retired in 2008.
 Cicero Price (1805-1888) - US Navy commodore who fought in the American Civil War and was commander of the East India Squadron.
 William Owsley (1782–1862) - Whig politician, Kentucky Court of Appeals judge, sixteenth Governor of Kentucky. His home, Pleasant Retreat, stands on the southern end of Lancaster. Owsley County is named in his honor. He is buried in Danville, Kentucky in the Bellevue Cemetery. His statue stands outside the Garrard Justice Center.
 Henry Smith (1788–1851) - early leader in the Texas independence movement; first American-born governor of Texas, serving during the Texas revolution and through the battles of the Alamo, Goliad, and San Jacinto. Though defeated for the Texas presidency in 1836 by Sam Houston, Smith later accepted appointment from Houston as the first Treasury Secretary of the Republic of Texas. In 1840, he was elected to the 5th Congress of the Texas Republic. His portrait hangs in the Texas State Capitol. Born in Garrard County in 1788 and raised there to adulthood, he became a merchant in Nashville, Tennessee. After his service to Texas, he established a gold mining camp in Los Angeles, California and was buried there. Smith, according to his wishes, remained a Texan. When his portrait was dedicated at the Texas State Capitol, his tribute declared that "California stands vigil over his dust and Texas is guardian of his fame."

See also

 National Register of Historic Places listings in Garrard County, Kentucky
 Garrard County High School

References

External links

 
 The Kentucky Highlands Project

 
1796 establishments in Kentucky
Counties of Appalachia
Kentucky counties
Populated places established in 1796
Slave cabins and quarters in the United States